Pierre Escourrou (17 February 1937 – 22 January 2022) was a French rugby league player. He played as a loose forward during the 1950s and 60s.

Biography
With Carcassonne, he won the French Rugby League Championship in 1966 and 1967. He was also the winner of the Coupe de France Lord Derby in 1961, 1967, and 1968. He was selected for the France national team for a game against Great Britain on 3 April 1963. He retired from playing in 1969.

He died on 22 January 2022, at the age of 84.

References

1937 births
2022 deaths
AS Carcassonne players
France national rugby league team players
French rugby league players
Limoux Grizzlies players